Makiko Mori  was a Japanese novelist. She won the 1980 Izumi Kyōka Prize for Literature for her book .

Early life and education 
Mori was born Eiko Matsuura on December 19, 1934 in Sakata, Japan.  She was the second of three children. Her father was a physician and died when she was six years old. Mori began suffering from rheumatism when she was 10 years old. She graduated from Yamagata Prefectural Sakata Higashi High School in 1953. Her mother died when she was 19 years old. Mori left home after her mother's death and moved to Kobe, then Tokyo. She began reading a lot, especially the works of Jean-Paul Sartre, Franz Kafka, Kōbō Abe, and Yutaka Haniya.

Career 
Mori made her debut as a writer in 1965 with the novel , which won the Bungakukai New Writer's Award and was nominated for the Akutagawa Prize. Three of her works were nominated for the Women's Literature Award. In 1980 her book  won the Izumi Kyōka Prize for Literature.

Mori lived a solitary life. Her death was discovered on November 17, 1992. Throughout her career she wrote nine books.  later wrote a book about her life titled .

Style 
Mori's style was known for her isolated female protagonists who live depressing lives with nihilistic outlooks. They are often emotionally adrift and wander with little sense of identity.  Many of her works are about isolation and the inevitability of death.

References 

1934 births
1992 deaths
20th-century Japanese novelists

People from Yamagata Prefecture
Writers from Yamagata Prefecture